Daniella Ohad is an American-Israeli design historian, educator, writer, and influencer. She teaches history of design, material culture, design connoisseurship, and design culture at Parsons School of Design and New York School of Interior Design in New York City. Ohad has curated and moderated educational talks and panels at Design Miami, the Museum of Arts and Design, the Cooper Hewitt, Smithsonian Design Museum, 92nd Street Y, AIA New York | Center for Architecture, the New York School of Interior Design, and Sotheby's. Her articles and essays have been published in academic journals and magazines, she has hosted a talk show on design and architecture, created documentaries, and curated private design collections. Her essay Hotel Design in British Mandate Palestine: Modernism and the Zionist Vision received a special mention from the jury of the Premio Bruno Zevi in 2010.

Early life and education 
Ohad was born and raised in Hod HaSharon, Israel to a Zionist family. She comes from the Feuchtwanger family, whose family tree and genealogy dates back to 18th-century Germany. Her great uncle Lion Feuchtwanger was the German Jewish novelist and playwright. Her uncle, Michael Ohad was the music and theater critic of Haaretz, director, journalist, and author. Her father, horticulturist Reuven Ohad pioneered the subtropical fruits industry in Israel, after bringing it from California in the 1950s. His cousin, historian Edgar Feuchtwanger, published the book Hitler, my Neighbor: Memories of a Jewish Childhood, 1929-1939. Members of her family established much of the banking infrastructure in pre-state Israel during the 1930s.

Ohad graduated from Katzenelson High School in Kfar Saba, served in the Military Intelligence Directorate, and achieved the rank of sergeant. After her service, she attended Tel Aviv University, where she received BA degree in Art History and Philosophy. In 1985, she moved to New York, received Master's degree in Museum Studies: Decorative Arts from the Fashion Institute of Technology, and PhD from Bard Graduate Center. Under the advisory of Amy Ogata and Derek E. Ostergard, she submitted her doctoral dissertation, Hotel Design in Zionist Palestine: Modernism, Tourism, and Nationalism, 1917-1948 in 2006. A part of it was published as an essay in the Journal of Israeli History.

Career 
For the past 25 years, Daniella Ohad has been a notable figure and thought leader across various disciplines in design and architecture. A public speaker, she moderated talks, hosted a talk show, curated events and exhibitions, produced documentaries, participated in global conferences, and appeared on television programs.

Teaching: As an educator, Ohad's work concerns many topics, including: modern design, connoisseurship, the history of taste and tastemakers, sustainable design, and design related to social justice. She has taught at The Cooper Union, Pratt Institute, The New School, New York School of Interior Design, School of Visual Arts, Bard College, and the Center for Architecture/American Institute of Architects.

Writing: Ohad contributed essays and articles on design and contemporary culture to various publications, including the Journal of Interior Design; Interior Design Magazine; The Journal of Israeli History; West 86th; Interiors: Design, Architecture, Culture; CoBo; Cultured Magazine; Modern Magazine; and others.

Documentaries: Ohad created a series of four documentaries on design connoisseurship: George Nakashima (1905-1990), Paul Evans (1931-1987), Frank Lloyd Wright (1967-1959), and Charlotte Perriand (1903-1999).

Television Appearances: Ohad appeared in the docu-series De.sign on the Italian network Sky arte, featuring New York City interior design culture.

Publications 
 
 
 
 Ohad Smith, Daniella (March, 2013), "The 'Designed' Israeli Interior, 1960-1977: Crafting Identity", Journal of Interior Design, 38 (3): 21–36.

References 

Living people
American art historians
Women art historians
American people of German-Jewish descent
Tel Aviv University alumni
Fashion Institute of Technology alumni
Bard College alumni
Design educators
American women historians
1961 births
21st-century American women